Reyes de Texcoco is a Mexican football club,  They reside in Texcoco, State of Mexico. The club currently places in the Segunda División de México and would not be eligible for promotion, since the club does not count with a stadium with a capacity of 15,000.

Current roster
 Updated on August 29, 2011.

External links
Tercera divicion

Footnotes

Football clubs in the State of Mexico
2011 establishments in Mexico